Tomáš Petříček (born 3 August 1963 in Žatec) is a Czechoslovak slalom canoeist who competed in the late 1980s and early 1990s. He won two silver medals at the 1989 ICF Canoe Slalom World Championships in Savage River, Maryland in the United States, earning them in the C2 event and the C2 team event.

Petříček also finished seventh in the C2 event at the 1992 Summer Olympics in Barcelona.

His partner in the boat throughout the whole of his career was Jan Petříček.

World Cup individual podiums

References

Sports-Reference.com profile

1963 births
Canoeists at the 1992 Summer Olympics
Czechoslovak male canoeists
Czech male canoeists
Living people
Olympic canoeists of Czechoslovakia
Medalists at the ICF Canoe Slalom World Championships
People from Žatec
Sportspeople from the Ústí nad Labem Region